Kurt John Budke (June 3, 1961 – November 17, 2011) was an American college basketball coach. Budke was inducted into the Women's Basketball Hall of Fame in 2015. His final coaching job was as the head coach for the Oklahoma State Cowgirls basketball women's team from 2005 until his death in an aviation accident.

Career
Prior to being named the women's basketball head coach of Oklahoma State in 2005, Budke had previously coached at Allen County Community College, Trinity Valley Community College, and Louisiana Tech. His teams reached 20 wins in each of his years, and had double digit losses in only one of his years, prior to his first year at Oklahoma State. At the junior college level, his record stands at 273–31 (.898), which is the highest winning percentage in NJCAA.

He was also a two time NJCAA coach of the year (1995, 1998). He was also the youngest coach ever to be inducted into the NJCAA Hall of Fame. From 2002 to 2005, he coached at Louisiana Tech, where he compiled an 80–16 record, highlighted by three consecutive NCAA tournament appearances. His first Louisiana Tech team finished 31–3, and ended the season with a national ranking of 6th. The Lady Techsters reeled off 29 consecutive victories, which is the fourth longest streak in the school's storied history. He was named the WAC coach of the year for his efforts.

In his five years as Oklahoma State's women's basketball head coach, his teams went 99–68, and made three NCAA tournament appearances, highlighted by a Sweet 16 run in the 2008 NCAA Women's Division I Basketball Tournament.

Death

Budke was killed in an airplane accident on November 17, 2011, when the Piper PA-28 Cherokee light aircraft he was  traveling in for a recruiting trip crashed near Perryville, Arkansas, killing all four on board.

The airplane was being piloted by Olin Branstetter, a former Oklahoma state senator and OSU graduate. Also on board were  assistant coach Miranda Serna and Branstetter's wife Paula. Budke left behind a wife and three children, the oldest of which was a student at Oklahoma State.

Head coaching record

References

External links
Oklahoma State profile

1961 births
2011 deaths
Accidental deaths in Arkansas
American men's basketball players
American women's basketball coaches
Barton Cougars men's basketball players
Basketball coaches from Kansas
Basketball players from Kansas
Junior college men's basketball coaches in the United States
Junior college women's basketball coaches in the United States
Louisiana Tech Lady Techsters basketball coaches
Oklahoma State Cowgirls basketball coaches
Sportspeople from Salina, Kansas
Victims of aviation accidents or incidents in the United States
Victims of aviation accidents or incidents in 2011
Washburn Ichabods men's basketball players
Wichita State University alumni